Freedom Day (Dzień Voli) is an unofficial holiday in Belarus celebrated on 25 March to commemorate the declaration of independence by the Belarusian Democratic Republic by the Third Constituent Charter on that date in 1918. It is also known as the 25-aha sakavika (March 25th) day.

Freedom Day has been celebrated as the Independence Day of Belarus by the Belarusian independence movement since the early 1920s. It is widely celebrated by the Belarusian diaspora.

In the United States, governors and US presidents, including Dwight Eisenhower, Ronald Reagan, George H. W. Bush and Bill Clinton, have traditionally issued official greetings to the Belarusian American community on 25 March.

The Belarusian opposition to the dictatorial regime of Alexander Lukashenko celebrates Freedom Day annually. The protests in Belarus are regularly accompanied by mass detention and torture of the protesters. The government does not recognize Freedom Day claiming that the Belarusian Democratic Republic was created by the Germans, which occupied Belarus in 1918 and with Lukashenko describing it as a "dismal page in our history". However, since the 2018 event which marked the centenary of the BDR, the authorities have somewhat rolled back some the crackdowns and criticism - in 2018 authorities granted a permission to organize a ceremony and concert in Minsk with 11,000 attendants, and in 2019 events in Minsk and the regions took place without large-scale repression. 

In 2020, Belarusian musician  created a song commemorated to the day and named it 25aha sakavika.

Freedom Day 2021 was the last day of protest marches against the alleged fraudulent 2020 Belarusian presidential election. More than 200 people were arrested.

See also 
 Public holidays in Belarus
 Freedom Day (disambiguation) in other countries

References

Remembrance days
Society of Belarus
March observances
Politics of Belarus
Public holidays in Belarus
Belarusian independence movement
Spring (season) events in Belarus